This page lists the municipal flags of Kyūshū, Japan. It is a part of the List of Japanese municipal flags, which is split into regions due to its size.

Complete lists of Japanese municipal flags pages

 List of municipal flags of Hokkaidō
 List of municipal flags of Tōhoku region
 List of municipal flags of Kantō region
 List of municipal flags of Chūbu region
 List of municipal flags of Kansai region
 List of municipal flags of Chūgoku region
 List of municipal flags of Shikoku
 List of municipal flags of Kyūshū

Fukuoka Prefecture

Cities

Towns and villages

Saga Prefecture

Cities

Towns and villages

Nagasaki Prefecture

Cities

Towns and villages

Kumamoto Prefecture

Cities

Towns and villages

Ōita Prefecture

Cities

Towns and villages

Miyazaki Prefecture

Cities

Towns and villages

Kagoshima Prefecture

Cities

Towns and villages

Okinawa Prefecture

Cities

Towns and villages

Municipal